Ormsby-Laughlin Textile Companies Mill is a historic textile mill located at Waterford in Saratoga County, New York. It was built in 1894 and is a -story, Romanesque Revival style, brick industrial building with a gable roof.  It features a -story tower at the center of the front facade.  The rear elevation features a 5-story elevator tower and a 100-foot-square brick smokestack attached to a 1-story wing. It is the only surviving factory associated with the major industrial community known as Dial City.

It was listed on the National Register of Historic Places in 1986.

References

Industrial buildings and structures on the National Register of Historic Places in New York (state)
Romanesque Revival architecture in New York (state)
Industrial buildings completed in 1894
Buildings and structures in Saratoga County, New York
National Register of Historic Places in Saratoga County, New York
Textile mills in New York (state)